Greenwood is an unincorporated community in Midland County, Texas, United States. It is a small suburb of Midland and is part of the Midland Metropolitan Statistical Area.

The Greenwood Independent School District serves area students.

Unlike most parts of Midland County, the Greenwood area is not in the service area of Midland College.

References

External links
 

Unincorporated communities in Texas
Unincorporated communities in Midland County, Texas